The League of Kitchens is a for-profit organization, that focuses on cooking classes taught by immigrants in Los Angeles, California and New York City, New York, to build cross-cultural connections and teach traditional cooking knowledge.

Background 
Brooklyn-based Lisa Gross is one of the founding members of the organization and explained the hiring process as; "we're not just hiring people who are good cooks. We're hiring people who have a deep knowledge of their culinary tradition, and who are warm hosts and willing to host groups of Americans in their homes." Gross also recounted how she wished to create the organization after the realization she had missed the opportunity to preserve the recipes and techniques of her Korean grandmothers cooking.

Structure 
The organization offers lessons taught in the homes of the female instructors, with up to six students to learn about the cuisine from Afghanistan, Argentina, Bangladesh, Greece, India, Japan, Lebanon, Mexico, Nepal, and Uzbekistan. The students learn how to cook the traditional food of the women, and learn about the culture before they eat the food that they have prepared.

References 

Organizations based in New York City
Organizations based in Los Angeles